Neuritin 1 is a protein that in humans is encoded by the NRN1 gene.

Function

This gene encodes a member of the neuritin family, and is expressed in postmitotic-differentiating neurons of the developmental nervous system and neuronal structures associated with plasticity in the adult. The expression of this gene can be induced by neural activity and neurotrophins. The encoded protein contains a consensus cleavage signal found in glycosylphoshatidylinositol (GPI)-anchored proteins. The encoded protein promotes neurite outgrowth and arborization, suggesting its role in promoting neuritogenesis. Overexpression of the encoded protein may be associated with astrocytoma progression. Alternative splicing results in multiple transcript variants. [provided by RefSeq, Jul 2013].

References

Further reading